Ina Ethe is the second  studio album of South African singer-songwriter and record producer Zonke. Solely produced and written by Zonke, Ina Ethe was released on 1 October 2011 through TMP Entertainment.

Commercial reception
Upon its release, Ina Ethe was certified double platinum by the Recording Industry of South Africa with over 80, 000 units sold. The album was also nominated in three music categories at the 18th South African Music Awards.

Critical reception

Ina Ethe was received to positive reviews among music critics. It was rated 4 stars out of 5 by Channel O, with the critic further stating that the album "sounds like it was definitely made for consumption and listening.". Zamani Khethelo of Just Curious gave the album 8 starts out of 10, stating that, "Overall this is a beautiful album and it deserves its place in your music collection".

Track listing

Release history

Accolades

References

Zonke albums
2011 albums